Salem is a settlement in South Africa, about  south of Grahamstown and  north of Alexandria. It was founded as a settlement of the Hezekiah Sephton party of 1820 Settlers comprising the following families and individuals: Jones, John Filmer, Wm. Muir, Urry, Watkins, Colling, Booth, Rees, Talbot, Bryant, Wm. Penny, Oats, Prior, Timlett, Rayner, Prinn, Istead, Jenkinson, Cyrus, Wells, Marsh, Serle, Sparks, C. Penny, Witherage, Gush, Wickman, Clark, Watson, Hancock, Shaw, Webb, Kidd, Meller, Evans, Hogsflesh, Slater, Croft, Turpin, Brown, Ochse, B. Rudman, S. Rudman, Caldicott, Watkins and R. Jones. The families travelled in three parties from Port Elizabeth, the last arriving at the Salem site on July 23. The name is of biblical origin and, proclaimed the Sunday after their arrival by the Reverend Shaw, means 'peace'; the local application refers to a reconciliation between sects.

A church built from mud blocks and thatch was consecrated in 1824, and replaced by a stone structure in 1832. The church often served as a refuge for women and children during the Frontier Wars. Several settler houses, built in the Georgian style, have been preserved.

In December 2017 the Constitutional Court upheld a land claim lodged in respect of the Salem Commonage by descendants of the Black community that previously occupied the land.

References

External links
 Makana Tourism - Salem

Populated places in the Makana Local Municipality
Populated places established in 1820